Henning (Tønsberg) Jakhelln (born 22 March 1939) is a Norwegian legal academic, and Professor Emeritus of Law (labour law) at the University of Oslo.

He was born in Bodø, and obtained the cand.jur. degree in 1963 and the lic.jur. degree in 1967. In 1965, he became an Assistant Professor at the University of Oslo. He became a full professor of law in 1990. His specialty is labour law.

References

1939 births
Living people
Norwegian legal scholars
Academic staff of the Faculty of Law, University of Oslo
Labour law scholars
People from Bodø